Oskar Walther Gerhard Julius Freiherr  von Watter (born 2 September 1861 in Ludwigsburg; died 23 August 1939 in Berlin) was a German Generalleutnant who came from an old Pomeranian noble family.

World War I 
In April 1913, von Watter took over the command of the 10th Brigade of Field Artillery, which he kept until 3 March 1915. With that force, General von Watter took part in the early fighting of World War I in France. Subsequently, he took over the 54th Infantry Division, which he commanded until 5 March 1918. The division was initially also deployed in France, but it was later sent to fight on the eastern front by the River Narew, and from September 1915, he was again at the western front. On 23 December 1917, he was awarded the Pour le Mérite for military bravery. Until 11 November 1918, he was commander of the XXVI Reserve Corps. On 3 November 1918, a few days before the end of the war, he was awarded the oak leaves of the "Pour le Mérite" (signifying a second award).

Post-war 
On the orders of the Reich government, units of the Reichswehr and Freikorps, under the command of von Watter, marched into the Ruhr area on 2 April 1920 and suppressed the Ruhr Uprising, which was taking place. After extrajudicial shootings resultedin more than a thousand dead, on 12 April 1920 Von Watter issued the order that "illegal behaviour" would be dealt with nine days after Reich President Friedrich Ebert had forbidden the summary trials that were taking place.

On his initiative, to the south of  Horst Castle, in Essen in 1934 a monument was erected in memory of the Freikorps soldiers who died in 1920 during the suppression of the Ruhr Uprising.

Von Watter died on 23 August 1939 in Berlin and was buried in the Invalids' Cemetery.

Notes

References

External links 
 

1861 births
1939 deaths
Recipients of the Pour le Mérite (military class)
20th-century Freikorps personnel
German Army generals of World War I
Burials at the Invalids' Cemetery
People from Ludwigsburg
People from the Kingdom of Württemberg
Barons of Germany
Lieutenant generals of Württemberg
Recipients of the Iron Cross (1914), 1st class
Lieutenant generals of the Reichswehr
Military personnel from Baden-Württemberg